Aníbal Gabriel Alcoba Rebollo  (born 24 January 1980 in Paso de los Toros) is a Uruguayan footballer who plays for Deportivo Maldonado in the Uruguayan Segunda División.

International career
Alcoba has made one appearance for the senior Uruguay national football team, a friendly against Mexico on 26 October 2005.

References

External links

1980 births
Living people
People from Paso de los Toros
Uruguayan footballers
Uruguay international footballers
Uruguayan Primera División players
Ecuadorian Serie A players
Montevideo Wanderers F.C. players
S.D. Quito footballers
Danubio F.C. players
Peñarol players
Sportivo Cerrito players
Central Español players
Atenas de San Carlos players
Deportivo Maldonado players
Uruguayan expatriate footballers
Expatriate footballers in Ecuador
Association football midfielders